The Block Six was a blocked field goal by the Penn State Nittany Lions football against the Ohio State Buckeyes, resulting in a 70-yard return touchdown in the final minutes of a 2016 rivalry game between the two teams in Happy Valley. The play led Penn State to beat Ohio State for the first time in five years, with a final score of 24–21. It is regarded as the best play in Penn State football history, and marked the program’s return to national relevance following the Jerry Sandusky scandal.

The Game
Penn State was a 19.5-point home underdog in this matchup, as they were not ranked in the AP poll. Much of this was attributed to this game being a White Out in State College, and the Buckeyes scraping by Wisconsin in an overtime road win the week before. Penn State was on a winning streak since falling to then-No. 4 Michigan in early September, while Ohio State was undefeated.

The game was initially very low scoring; neither team was able to get points on the board in the first quarter. By the beginning of the second quarter, however, Ohio State answered with two Tyler Durbin field goals and a Marcus Baugh touchdown, making the Buckeyes have a 12–0 lead. However, in the final seconds of the second quarter, a pass by Trace McSorley to Chris Godwin in the endzone completely changed the dynamics of the game for Penn State.

The third quarter saw Ohio State pick up another touchdown (by Curtis Samuel) and a high snap on a punt resulting in a safety. However, the Buckeyes remained scoreless throughout the fourth quarter. This was while Trace McSorley scored a touchdown with a successful conversion, as well as a 34-yard field goal by Tyler Davis.

The Play
With just over four minutes remaining in regulation time and the score 21–17 Ohio State, the Buckeyes were within field goal range but were held to a fourth-down-and-seven at the 31-yard line. Tyler Durbin looked to make Ohio State score for the first time in the quarter with a 45-yard field goal. Speculators were highly anticipating the kick to be good, making the (eventual winning) score 24–17 Ohio State, as Durbin was described to be "super reliable from inside of 40."

However, the kick was blocked by safety Marcus Allen and knocked into the hands of cornerback Grant Haley, who sped past Durbin and another Buckeye, running 71 yards for a Penn State touchdown, making the final score of the game 24–21 Penn State.

Facts
James Franklin's first win over a ranked opponent as head coach of Penn State
Penn State's first ranked win since the season-ending upset of Wisconsin in 2013
Penn State's first win over their rival, Ohio State, since 2011
The Nittany Lions' first home win over their rival since 2005 (the first White Out Game)
Penn State's first win over a top-5 team since 1999
Ohio State's first road loss under Urban Meyer
The fourth quarter was the first full quarter Ohio State was shut out since 2011
Longest regulation Big Ten game at the time, lasting over 4 hours, and extending past midnight

Aftermath

In the stadium
The crowd at Beaver Stadium was stunned by the play, as it gave the Nittany Lions the first lead with 4:27 remaining in the 4th quarter. Immediately upon Haley's touchdown, spectators stormed the field as Zombie Nation's Kernkraft 400 played from the stadium's loudspeakers. Head Coach James Franklin stated that he was "very happy for our kids" to experience a White Out win, the first win over Ohio State in eight years.

Celebratory riots
One controversial event that occurred immediately following the game was a celebratory riot in Downtown State College, centered along Beaver Avenue. Approximately 10,000 fans, primarily Penn State students blocked several roads and wreaked havoc, such as breaking light posts and lighting sofas on fire. Centre County Police were assisted by the Pennsylvania State police, who came in riot gear to break up the riot. Total damages were estimated to be $17,000, and 13 individuals were charged as a result of not following orders.

References

2016 Big Ten Conference football season
American football incidents
Ohio State Buckeyes football games
Penn State Nittany Lions football games
October 2016 sports events in the United States
2016 in sports in Pennsylvania